There are several St George's Barracks in the world.
St George's Barracks, Bicester
St George Barracks, Gosport
St George's Barracks, London
St George's Barracks, North Luffenham
St George's Barracks, Sutton Coldfield